Robin Fluß (born 7 May 1996) is a German footballer who plays as a midfielder for NOFV-Oberliga Süd club SC Freital.

References

External links

 Robin Fluß at FuPa

1996 births
People from Freital
Footballers from Saxony
Living people
German footballers
Association football midfielders
Dynamo Dresden II players
Dynamo Dresden players
FSV Wacker 90 Nordhausen players
Bischofswerdaer FV 08 players
3. Liga players
Regionalliga players
Oberliga (football) players